Alexander Semizyan (born 7 March 1985) is a former Russian-born Armenian football striker.

Semizyan previously played for FC Kuban Krasnodar in the Russian Premier League and FC Chernomorets Novorossiysk and FC Sochi-04 in the Russian First Division.

References

1985 births
Living people
People from Novorossiysk
Russian footballers
Russian people of Armenian descent
Russian Premier League players
FC Kuban Krasnodar players
FC Chernomorets Novorossiysk players
Association football forwards
Sportspeople from Krasnodar Krai